Deal Pier is the last remaining fully intact leisure pier in Kent. It is the third pier to exist in Deal and was opened in November 1957 by the Duke of Edinburgh. Its structure was extensively refurbished and repaired in 1997, with work including the replacement of much of the concrete cladding on the pier's main piles. Work began in April 2008 to construct a new pier-head with a modern restaurant which opened the same year.

History

Early piers
The seafront at Deal has been adorned with three separate piers in the town's history. The first, built in 1838, was designed by Sir John Rennie, although its wooden structure was destroyed during a storm in 1857. Originally intended to be  in length, financial problems meant just  was completed, which when opened, was just the sixth pier in the country.

It sustained impact damage several times during the 1870s and was acquired by Deal Council in 1920. A popular pleasure pier, it survived until the Second World War, when it was struck and severely damaged by a mined Dutch ship, the Nora, in January 1940. Permission to demolish the pier was authorised by Winston Churchill, which left just the shore-side toll house, itself later demolished in 1954.

In December 1950, the Deal Corporation received a grant of £750 to compensate for damage sustained during the war.

Third pier
The present pier, designed by Sir W. Halcrow & Partners, was opened on 19 November 1957 by the Duke of Edinburgh. The lowest of the three tiers is almost permanently underwater except for the lowest tide and has become disused. A notice announces that it is the same length as the RMS Titanic, but that ship was over  shorter. The pier is a popular sport fishing venue.

Refurbishment works included resurfacing, replacement and repainting of railings and an upgrade to the drainage system. The works coincided with the 60 year anniversary of the pier's official opening.

References
Citations

Sources

 
 
 

Piers in Kent
Deal, Kent